Outsider is the 23rd studio album by Uriah Heep, released in Europe in June 2014 by Frontiers Records. It was produced by Mike Paxman and it is the first album with bassist Dave Rimmer. Cover art was created by Igor Morski.

Track listing

Personnel 
Uriah Heep
Mick Box – guitar, backing vocals
Phil Lanzon – keyboards, backing vocals
Bernie Shaw – lead vocals
Russell Gilbrook – drums, backing vocals
Dave Rimmer – bass, backing vocals

Production
Mike Paxman – producer
Steve Rispin, Peter Waterman – engineers
Mark "Tufty" Evans – mixing at Croosh Alley Studios
Bob Fairshield – mastering

Charts

References 

Uriah Heep (band) albums
2014 albums
Albums produced by Mike Paxman
Frontiers Records albums